Family Life may also refer to:

Books and publications
 Family Life (novel), a 2014 novel by Akhil Sharma
 Family Life (Amish magazine), a Canadian magazine published primarily for the Old Order Amish
 Family Life (Wenner Media magazine), an American parenting magazine (1993–2001)
 Family Life, a magazine supplement of the Belfast Telegraph, Northern Ireland

Film and TV
 Family Life (1971 Polish film), directed by Krzysztof Zanussi
 Family Life (1971 British film), directed by Ken Loach
 Family Life (1985 film), a French film
 Family Life (2017 film), a Chilean film

Organisations
Family life education
 FamilyLife, a division of Christian organisation Cru 
 Family Life Network, a Christian radio network
 Family Life Radio, a Christian radio network
 Family & Life, and Irish anti-abortion campaign group